Olympic Village is an underground station on the Canada Line of Metro Vancouver's SkyTrain rapid transit system. The station is located at the intersection of Cambie Street and West 2nd Avenue, adjacent to the Cambie Street Bridge in Vancouver, British Columbia, Canada.

The station is located in the Fairview neighbourhood and serves the South False Creek residential and commercial areas, which included the Olympic Village built for the 2010 Winter Olympics. The use of the term "Olympic" was licensed for use from the International Olympic Committee.

History

During the planning and approval process for the Canada Line, Olympic Village station was initially intended for completion along with the rest of the line. When the cost of the project had to be scaled back by TransLink (circa 2005), the station was deferred until after the opening of the Canada Line; however, the City of Vancouver owned the station site and decided to fund the station's construction to spur redevelopment of its lands and the nearby Southeast False Creek neighbourhood, and the station's construction was restored to the initial phase.

The station opened in 2009 and was designed by the architecture firm VIA Architecture. "Olympic Village" is the third name for this station: its original proposed names were "2nd Avenue" and later "False Creek South".

Services

Olympic Village is within a short walk of the False Creek Ferries and Aquabus ferry stop at Spyglass and Stamp's Landing. Both companies provide service to Granville Island, David Lam Park, Yaletown, Plaza of Nations and Science World, while False Creek Ferries provides service to Kitsilano and the West End.

The station was within walking distance of Leg-In-Boot station on the Vancouver Downtown Historic Railway, a tram service that operated on weekends from 1998 to 2011, connecting Science World and Main Street–Science World station to Granville Island. The Downtown Historic Railway ceased operations in 2011 due to financial constraints.

During the 2010 Winter Olympics, the Olympic Line, a temporary streetcar demonstration service, operated on the Downtown Historic Railway between Olympic Village station and Granville Island.

Station information

Station layout

Entrances
Olympic Village is served by a single entrance located on 2nd Avenue at the southwest end of the Cambie Street Bridge.

Transit connections

The following bus routes can be found in close proximity to Olympic Village station:

Public art
Outside the station is a sculpture by Marie Khouri, "Le Banc" or "The Bench", intended to double as a bench for people to sit in. Soon after the Canada Line opened, the sculpture was disfigured by skateboarders who used it as a ramp. The work was repaired by Khouri at her own expense.

References

Canada Line stations
Railway stations in Canada opened in 2009
Buildings and structures in Vancouver
2009 establishments in British Columbia